Tallent is an unincorporated community in the northern part of Crooked Creek Township in Bollinger County, Missouri, United States. Tallent lies 4 1/2 miles southwest of Patton, 
and was named for Reverend George W. Tallent, who was a local minister and school commissioner.
A post office was established here in 1902, and operated until 1935.

References 

Unincorporated communities in Bollinger County, Missouri
Cape Girardeau–Jackson metropolitan area
Unincorporated communities in Missouri